Bernsdorf or Njedźichow (Upper Sorbian) is a town with 6,427 inhabitants in the district of Bautzen, in Upper Lusatia, Saxony, Germany. The town Bernsdorf consists of Bernsdorf proper and the Ortschaften (municipal divisions) Großgrabe, Straßgräbchen, Wiednitz and Zeißholz.

History
Within Prussian Silesia (Province of Silesia 1815–1919 and 1938–41, Province of Lower Silesia 1919–38 and 1941–45), Bernsdorf was part of Landkreis Hoyerswerda. Within the East German Bezirk Cottbus, it was part of Kreis Hoyerswerda. Following German reunification in 1990, Bernsdorf became part of Saxony.

International relations

Bernsdorf is twinned with:
 Quinsac (France), since 2006
 Steinenbronn (Germany), since German reunification

Sons and daughters of the city

 Gerhard Möhwald (1920–2012), former mayor and honorary citizen
 Christian Rudolph (born 1949), athlete (hurdles)

References 

 
Populated places in Bautzen (district)
West Lusatia